The 2017 World Draughts-64 Championship held in Saint Peterburg, Russia. 64 players from Europe, Asia, Africa, North America, and South America competed in the tournament, which started on October 20, 2017, and ended on October 28, 2017. The tournament was played in hotel «Moscow». The winning prize for the tournament was about three million rubles (about US$52,000). At the same time, the Women's World Draughts Championship was held. Championship played in classic (at the Russian draughts), rapid (at the Brazilian draughts) and blitz (at the Russian draughts) formats.

Classic program

Rules and regulations
In the first stage participants played Swiss-system tournament with 8 rounds. To define the places with equal points used of Buchholz system. The first 16 participated in the final. The final was in the play-off form. Two points were given for each win, one point for each draw, no points for each loss. Players from 17 to 64 played additionally Swiss-system tournament with 2 rounds.

The final classification is based on the total points obtained. If two or more players have the same total points to define the places:

1. Number of points scored by all competitors (Buchholz coefficient)

2. Number of points scored by opponents, excluding the lowest result (reduced Solkof coefficient)

3. Match up to the first victory with a shorter time controls: a classic game — 5’+3” till the end of the game for each participant.

Preliminary stage

GMI — international grandmaster

MI — international master

MF — master FMJD

Quarterfinals

 1-8 places

 9-16 places

Semifinal

 For 1-4 places

 For 5-8 places

 For 9-12 places

 For 13-16 places

Final

Match for 1 place

Match for 3 place

Match for 5 place

Match for 7 place

Match for 9 place

Match for 11 place

Match for 13 place

Match for 15 place

Final standing

Rapid program
In the first stage participants played Swiss-system tournament with 9 rounds at Brazilian draughts. The first 4 participated in the semifinal and final.

The classification is based on the total points obtained. If two or more players had the same total points, the following was used to decide the placings:

1. Number of points scored by opponents, excluding the lowest result (reduced  Solkof coefficient)

2. Number of points scored by all competitors (Buchholz coefficient)

There were 72 participants from 43 countries.

Time control: 7’+5” till the end of the game for each  participant.

Results

Blitz program
In the first stage participants played Swiss-system tournament with 9 rounds at Russian version draughts. The first 4 participated in the semifinal and final.
 
The classification is based on the total points obtained. If two or more players will have same total points to define the places:

1. Number of points scored by all competitors (Buchholz coefficient)

2. Number of points scored by opponents, excluding the lowest result (reduced  Solkof coefficient)

There were 74 participants from 43 countries.

Time control: 3’+2” till the end of the game for each  participant.

Results

External links
 Regulations of the World Draughts-64 Championship 2017 Among men and women
 World Draughts-64 Championship on site IDF
 Results semifinal on site Chessarbiter.com
 Results for 1-16 places on site Chessarbiter.com
 Final results on site Chessarbiter.com

2017 in draughts
Draughts world championships